Andrea Stelzer (born c. 1965) is a South African beauty queen who also represented Germany in the Miss Universe pageant. In 1985, Stelzer was Miss South Africa and slated to be a delegate to the 1985 Miss Universe pageant, but due to anti-apartheid demonstrations was forced to withdraw from the competition. In 1989, she was Germany's representative to Miss Universe 1989, where she placed in the semi-finals.

In her honour, a rose variety was named "Andrea Stelzer".

External links
 Who's who South African entry
 https://www.welt-der-rosen.de/duftrosen/rosen_an.htm#andrea_stelzer
 https://web.archive.org/web/20080719181216/http://www.jimmyspageantpage.com/sa.html

1960s births
Living people
Miss Universe 1989 contestants
South African beauty pageant winners
South African people of German descent
German beauty pageant winners